Berlin-Neukölln is a railway station in the Neukölln district of Berlin with the same name.

Opened as a station on the Ringbahn in 1872 the current station building was erected in 1930 by Alfred Grenander, enabling to exchange into the underground station opened that year. Until 1961 the station's name was Berlin Neukölln-Südring to refer to the S-Bahn. However, after the Berlin Wall was built, and as the S-Bahn was under the influence of the GDR government, the addition Südring was deleted. In 1980 the Ringbahn stopped business. 1992 after the Ringbahn connection was established again, the addition Südring is seen again. The next station is Grenzallee.

Popular culture
 The front of the S-Bahn-Station Neukölln is heavily featured in the German documentary Neukölln Unlimited, where the film's protagonists spend a lot of their time.

References

External links

Berlin S-Bahn stations
Buildings and structures in Neukölln
Railway stations in Germany opened in 1872